Calamus egregius is a species of flowering plant in the family Arecaceae. It is found only in  the Hainan region of China. Its natural habitats are subtropical or tropical moist lowland forests and subtropical or tropical moist montane forests.

Calamus egregius is threatened by habitat loss.

References

egregius
Endemic flora of China
Flora of Hainan
Vulnerable flora of Asia
Plants described in 1937
Taxonomy articles created by Polbot
Taxa named by Max Burret